SNJB's Late Sau. K. B. Jain College of Engineering, Chandwad (SNJB's KBJ COE) is a private engineering colleed in Chandwad, Nashik, Maharashtra, India. It is permanently affiliated to the Savitribai Phule Pune University and approved by the Directorate of Technical Education (DTE), Maharashtra State and All India Council of Technical Education (AICTE), New Delhi.

It is an un-aided, non-autonomous, Jain-minority college.

Academics
SNJB's KBJ COE offers undergraduate and postgraduate courses of study in engineering. The four year undergraduate programme leads to the degree of Bachelor of Engineering (BE) and two year postgraduate programme leads to the degree of Master of Engineering. The courses offered are as follows:

Undergraduate courses:
 Civil Engineering
 Computer Engineering
 Mechanical Engineering
 Electronics and Telecommunication Engineering

Postgraduate courses:
 Master of Business Administration (MBA)

Facilities
The campus houses a Polytechnic, pharmacy, Medical college, hostels (boys/girls). It has sporting facilities like cricket/football ground, badminton, basketball, volleyball court, and a gym. Wi-Fi connection is available throughout college. Canteen for the refreshment of students.

Departments 
 Civil Engineering
 Computer Engineering
 Mechanical Engineering
 Electronics and Telecommunication Engineering
 Master of Business Administration (MBA)

See also
chandwad

External links
 
 snjb's Medical college
 snjb's Hhjb Polytechnic

Jain universities and colleges
Engineering colleges in Maharashtra
All India Council for Technical Education
Colleges affiliated to Savitribai Phule Pune University
Education in Nashik district
Educational institutions established in 2004
2004 establishments in Maharashtra